What I Need may refer to:
 "What I Need" (Ray J song), 2006
 "What I Need" (Hayley Kiyoko song), 2018
 "What I Need" (Julie Reeves song), 1999
 "Ghetto Day/What I Need", 1994 double single by Crystal Waters